Sakhiya dance is a traditional dance performed by the Tharu community during the Dashain and Tihar festivals. Officially, it begins on the day of Krishna Janmashtami. The dance is mainly performed by the unmaried young girls and boys. In the first phase, boys play drums and girls use pumpkin leaves. In the second  phase, girls use jute fabric and in the final phase, girls have to use cymbals. Boys wear Dhoti and Jhuluwa while girls wear Choliya and Fariya. Various ornaments and jewelries are also worn.

The dance is lead by the village headsman and generally performed in his house's courtyard. The boy's group select a leader called Aguwa Mandariya and an assistant called Pachhuwa Mandariy.  Similalry, the girl's group select a leader called Guru Mohriyiniya and two assistants called Pachhgihniya. On the day of dance, the participants is summoned to avoid evil spirit and the dance is performed in the courtyard of village headsman.

References

Tharu culture